Protorabinae is an extinct subfamily of beetles in the family Carabidae. It contains 36 species in 13 genera, all extinct.

 Genus Aethocarabus Ren; Lu & Guo, 1995
 Aethocarabus levigatus Ren; Lu & Guo, 1995
 Genus Atrirabus Hong & Wang, 1990
 Atrirabus shandongensis Hong & Wang, 1990
 Atrirabus tuanwangensis Hong & Wang, 1990
 Genus Cordorabus Ponomarenko, 1977
 Cordorabus antennatus Ponomarenko, 1977 Karabastau Formation, Kazakhstan, Callovian/Oxfordian
 Cordorabus minimus Ponomarenko, 1977 Karabastau Formation, Kazakhstan, Callovian/Oxfordian
 Cordorabus notatus Ponomarenko, 1977 Karabastau Formation, Kazakhstan, Callovian/Oxfordian
 Cordorabus striatus Ponomarenko, 1986 Gurvan-Eren Formation, Mongolia, Aptian
 Cordorabus vittatus Ponomarenko, 1980 Mogotuin Formation, Mongolia, Aptian
 Genus Cretorabus Ponomarenko, 1977
 Cretorabus capitatus Ponomarenko, 1977 Zaza Formation, Russia, Aptian
 Cretorabus latus Ponomarenko, 1977 Zaza Formation, Russia, Aptian
 Cretorabus medius Hong & Wang, 1990
 Cretorabus orientalis Ponomarenko, 1989  Tsagaantsav Formation, Mongolia, Valanginian
 Cretorabus ovalis Ponomarenko, 1989 Dzun-Bain Formation, Mongolia, Aptian
 Cretorabus rasnitsyni Wang & Zhang, 2011 Yixian Formation, China, Aptian
 Cretorabus sulcatus Ponomarenko, Coram & Jarzembowski, 2005 Lulworth Formation, United Kingsom, Berriasian
 Genus Denudirabus Ren; Lu & Guo, 1995
 Denudirabus exstrius Ren; Liu & Guo, 1995
 Genus Lirabus Hong, 1992
 Lirabus granulatus Hong, 1992
 Genus Lithorabus Ponomarenko, 1977
 Lithorabus incertus Ponomarenko, 1977 Dzhil Formation, Kyrgyzstan Hettangian
 Genus Magnirabus Hong & Wang, 1990
 Magnirabus furvus Hong & Wang, 1990
 Genus Mesorabus Ponomarenko, 1977
 Mesorabus elongatus Ponomarenko, 1977
 Genus Nebrorabus Ponomarenko, 1989
 Nebrorabus baculum Ponomarenko, 1989
 Nebrorabus capitatus Ponomarenko, 1989
 Nebrorabus elongatus (Ponomarenko, 1986)
 Nebrorabus nebrioides Ponomarenko, 1989
 Genus Ovrabites Ponomarenko, 1977
 Ovrabites incertus Ponomarenko, 1993 Emanra Formation, Russia, Turonian
 Ovrabites jurassicus Ponomarenko, 1977 Karabastau Formation, Kazakhstan, Callovian/Oxfordian
 Ovrabites ovalis Ponomarenko, 1977 Karabastau Formation, Kazakhstan, Callovian/Oxfordian
 Genus Penecupes Ren, 1995
 Penecupes rapax Ren, 1995 Lushangfen Formation, China, Aptian
 Genus Protorabus Ponomarenko, 1977
 Protorabus crassus Ponomarenko, 1989 Daya Formation, Russia, Hauterivian
 Protorabus kobdoensis Ponomarenko, 1986 Gurvan-Eren Formation, Mongolia, Aptian
 Protorabus magnus Ponomarenko, 1977 Karabastau Formation, Kazakhstan, Callovian/Oxfordian
 Protorabus minisculus Zhang, 1997
 Protorabus nigrimonticola Ponomarenko, 1977 Karabastau Formation, Kazakhstan, Callovian/Oxfordian
 Protorabus planus Ponomarenko, 1977 Karabastau Formation, Kazakhstan, Callovian/Oxfordian
 Protorabus polyphlebius Ren, 1995 Lushangfen Formation, China, Aptian
 Protorabus tsaganensis Ponomarenko, 1989 Dzun-Bain Formation, Mongolia, Aptian

References

Carabidae subfamilies